The Feick Building is a historic commercial building located at 158–160 E. Market St. in Sandusky, Ohio.

Description and history 
It was built to three-story height in 1909 and was increased to eight stories in 1916. It was designed by Purcell & Feick, which was a Minneapolis-based architectural partnership formed of two Cornell classmates, one being George Feick, Jr.

The building was built in 1916 by George Feick, Sr., of Sandusky.

It was listed on the National Register of Historic Places in 2009.

References

Commercial buildings on the National Register of Historic Places in Ohio
Buildings designated early commercial in the National Register of Historic Places
Buildings and structures in Erie County, Ohio
National Register of Historic Places in Erie County, Ohio

Commercial buildings completed in 1909